Makerere University, Kampala (Mak) is Uganda's largest and oldest institution of higher learning, first established as a technical school in 1922. It became an independent national university in 1970. Today, Makerere University is composed of nine colleges and one school offering programmes for about 36,000 undergraduates and 4,000 postgraduates. The main administrative block was gutted by fire in September 2020 and the cause of the fire is yet to be established.

U.S. News & World Report has ranked Makerere University as the eighth best university in Africa and the 569th best university worldwide. In the 2020 U.S. News & World Report ranking, Makerere is the highest-ranked university in sub-Saharan Africa outside of South Africa. The Times Higher Education World University Rankings for 2016 ranked it as the fourth best university in Africa.

Makerere University is the alma mater of many post-independence African leaders, including Ugandan president Milton Obote and Tanzanian presidents Julius Nyerere and Benjamin Mkapa. The former president of the Democratic Republic of the Congo, Joseph Kabila, and former Kenyan president the late Mwai Kibaki are also Makerere alumni.

In the years immediately after Uganda's independence, Makerere University was a focal point for the literary activity that was central to African nationalist culture. Many prominent writers, including Nuruddin Farah, Ali Mazrui, David Rubadiri, Okello Oculi, Ngũgĩ wa Thiong'o, John Ruganda, Paul Theroux, Nobel Prize laureate V. S. Naipaul, and Peter Nazareth, were at Makerere University at one point in their writing and academic careers.

Because of student unrest and faculty disenchantment, the university was closed three times between 2006 and 2016. The final time was on 1 November 2016 when President Yoweri Museveni declared it closed indefinitely. The university was reopened in January 2017.

History

Founding of the technical school
The trade school that became Makerere University began operating in 1921 with the first classes in carpentry, building construction and mechanics. In 1922 it was founded as the  "Uganda Technical College" with additional courses in the arts, education, agriculture and medicine. That same year it was again renamed as Makerere College.  In 1928, the vocational classes were separated from the college and renamed Kampala Technical School. In 1937 the college began offering post-secondary education certificate courses.

University
In 1943, the British Protectorate government proposed the university, which led to a controversial struggle.  It was described as "a plot to steal African soil for European settlement," by the Bataka Party.  In response to this campaign, there was rioting in the capital of Kampala.

In 1949 Makerere College was granted university status and its name became Makerere College, University of East Africa.  In the same year, the Bataka Party had been banned by the British Protectorate government, because of acts of riot and arson committed after a Bataka protest gathering.

Unrest in the 2000s
The university was closed three times between 2006 and 2016.

Beginning on 1 August 2016, the non-teaching staff went on strike demanding their back pay.  The strike lasted three weeks and the government agreed to pay them by the end of October; however, the government failed to do so. This was but one more broken promise in the cycle of failed promises, strikes and more promises. That strike was followed by a strike of the lecturers over unpaid incentive pay, and that strike was joined by students in solidarity. This led to President Yoweri Museveni closing the university "indefinitely". Additional protests, including from parents whose children were left hanging in mid-semester, led to Museveni appointing a special commission to try to rectify the situation but with no promises of reopening.  The commission's report was due in late February 2017.

On the 20th of September, 2020, the main building of Makerere University (the Ivory Tower) was severely damaged by fire, allegedly following a probe by Uganda Parliament into financial mismanagement by university authorities.

Rankings and reputation

Organization
The University Council is the supreme governing body of the university while Senate is the chief academic organ of the university.

Subcommittees of the University Council
Appointments Board 
Finance, Planning and Administration
Quality Assurance, Gender and ICT
Estates and Works
Staff Development, Welfare and Retirement Benefits
Students Affairs and Disciplinary
Honorary Awards
Audit

Academic units

Colleges
College of Agricultural and Environmental Sciences
College of Business and Management Sciences
College of Computing & Information Sciences
College of Education and External Studies
College of Engineering, Design, Art and Technology
College of Health Sciences
College of Humanities and Social Sciences
College of Natural Sciences
College of Veterinary Medicine, Animal resources and BioSecurity

Schools
School of Law
Makerere University Business School

Affiliated institutions
 Alokolum Seminary
 Katigondo Seminary
 Ggaba Seminary
 Kinyamasika Seminary
 Mbale School Clinical Officers
 Mbale School Hygiene
 Mulago Paramedical Schools
 Kampala University

Notable former and current faculty administrators
 Barnabas Nawangwe, architect, academic and current Vice Chancellor
 John Ddumba Ssentamu, economist, academic and banker, former Vice Chancellor
 Venansius Baryamureeba, computer scientist, former Vice Chancellor
 Hugh Dinwiddy, lecturer in literature, warden of Northcote Hall
 George Kirya, microbiologist, diplomat, academic, former Vice Chancellor at Makerere and former Chairman of Uganda Health Services Commission
 Mahmood Mamdani, political scientist and historian
 Ali Mazrui, academic, historian and political scientist
 Apolo Nsibambi, former Prime Minister of Uganda and former Chancellor of Makerere University
 Joe Oloka-Onyango, former Dean of Law and human rights expert
 Okot p'Bitek, poet
 John Ssebuwufu, a renowned chemist, former Vice Chancellor of Makerere University, current Chancellor of Kyambogo University
 David Serwadda, former dean, School of Public Health 
 Nelson Sewankambo, principal, College of Health Sciences
 Harriet Mayanja-Kizza, current dean of students, Makerere University School of Medicine 
 Sylvia Tamale, lawyer, academic, women's rights activist
 Ngũgĩ wa Thiong'o, novelist
 Timothy Wangusa, author, poet, one time minister of education
 David Wasawo, zoologist and educationist, former vice principal
 William Bazeyo, former Dean of Makerere University School of Public Health (2009–2017). Deputy Vice Chancellor of Makerere University, responsible for Finance and Administration, since September 2017.

Other academics
 Rose Mbowa - Theatre academic, playwright and actress - formerly Head of Department of Music, Dance and Drama
Hakim Sendagire - Physician, biochemist and microbiologist. Current Dean of Habib Medical School
 Charles Olweny - Physician, oncologist, medical researcher. Former Vice Chancellor of Uganda Martyrs University. Current Chancellor of Mbarara University.
 Paul D'Arbela - Physician, cardiologist, academic. Dean of the Mother Kevin Postgraduate Medical School, Nsambya. 
 Celestino Obua - Physician, pharmacologist, academic. Current Vice Chancellor of Mbarara University.
Catherine Abbo, medical doctor and researcher
Raphael Owor, medical doctor, former Chancellor of Mbarara University, former professor of Pathology at Makerere University School of Medicine.

Notable alumni

Political figures and government employees

 Lucy Akello, Ugandan politician, who serves as the elected member of parliament for the Amuru District Women's Constituency, in the 10th Parliament.
Samuel Awich (1973), justice of the Supreme Court of Belize
Kizza Besigye, physician, retired colonel in the Uganda People's Defence Force. Opposition politician, former leader of the Forum for Democratic Change party, presidential candidate in 2001, 2006, and 2011.
Godfrey Binaisa, former president of Uganda
 Gilbert Bukenya, former vice-president of Uganda
 Kanyama Chiume, a Malawian who worked for the independence of Nyasaland (now Malawi)
Moses Ebuk, physician, neurophyiologist, former lecturer and tutor in the department of physiology at the Makerere University College of Health Sciences, diplomat. Ambassador of Uganda to the Russian Federation.
 Daphrosa Gahakwa, Rwandan education minister
 Aloisea Inyumba, Rwandan minister for gender and family promotion
 Joseph Kabila, Congolese politician and president of the Democratic Republic of the Congo
Allen Kagina, Public Administrator
Filemona F. Indire former Kenyan ambassador, leading educator and member of parliament.
Patrick Karegeya, former Rwandan head of intelligence
Andrew Felix Kaweesi, Assistant Inspector General of Police (AIGP) Uganda, a military officer and policeman. He was the Spokesperson of Uganda Police Force from August 2016 to 2017.
 Specioza Kazibwe, former vice-president of Uganda
Mwai Kibaki, the third president of Kenya from December 2002 until April 2013. Graduated at the top of his class (summa cum laude) in 1955 with a Bachelor of Arts in economics.
 Samson Kisekka, former vice-president of Uganda
Benedicto Kiwanuka, first prime minister and first chief justice of Uganda
Crispus Kiyonga, physician, minister of defense of Uganda
Sam Kutesa, Uganda's foreign affairs minister. president of the sixty-ninth session of the United Nations General Assembly
Henry Kyemba, minister of health under Idi Amin
Catherine Kyobutungi, Executive Director of the African Population and Health Research Center
Yusuf Lule, former president of Uganda
Norbert Mao, former guild president of Makerere University and current president of Democratic Party
Amama Mbabazi, former secretary general of the National Resistance Movement and former prime minister of Uganda
Benjamin Mkapa, former Tanzanian politician and former president of Tanzania
Jennifer Musisi, Lawyer and Public Administrator
Jehoash Mayanja Nkangi, government minister and former Katikkiro of Buganda (1964–1966, 1993–1994)
 Apolo Nsibambi, former prime minister of Uganda and former chancellor of Makerere University
Julius Nyerere, Tanzanian politician and the first president of Tanzania
Anthony Ochaya, Ugandan Minister of Planning and Economic Development under the UNLF regime, World Bank official
 Oginga Odinga, Kenyan politician and the first vice president of Kenya
 Milton Obote, two-time former president of Uganda
 Ruhakana Rugunda, prime minister of Uganda, physician, and former permanent representative of Uganda to the United Nations
 Emmanuel Tumusiime-Mutebile, governor, Bank of Uganda
 Bobi Wine, (Robert Kyagulanyi Ssentamu), Ugandan politician, businessman, entrepreneur, philanthropist, musician, freedom fighter and actor
 Anita Annet Among, Speaker of the 11th Parliament of Uganda (2021 - 2026), from 25 March 2022, after serving as the Deputy Speaker from 24 May 2021 until 25 March 2022.

Film, Television and Radio
 Cleopatra Koheirwe, Ugandan actress, singer and media personality
 Alex Muhangi, Ugandan Comedian and actor
 Mowzey Radio Aka Moses Nakintije Ssekibogo,  Ugandan Singer,  Notable,  Best Song Writer of His Era and Actor  R.I.P 
Housen Mushema, Ugandan actor and model
Rehema Nanfuka, Ugandan Actress, director and producer
Crystal Newman, Ugandan media personality, MC and motivational speaker.
Gladys Oyenbot, Ugandan actress and producer
Edwin Musiime, television host
Morris Mugisha, actor, producer and director

Sportspeople
 Henry Osinde – Ugandan born Cricketer currently Canadian fast bowler.
 Moses Muhangi - president of Uganda Boxing Federation

Writers and journalists
 Christopher Henry Muwanga Barlow 
 Jane Kaberuka, novelist
Daniel Kalinaki, journalist
Micere Githae Mugo Kenyan novelist, poet, activist
 John Nagenda, writer, political commentator and adviser to the president of Uganda, Yoweri Museveni
 Peter Nazareth, author, critic
Michael Nsimbi, "Father of Ganda literature"
Barbie Kyagulanyi, writer and activist
 Okello Oculi, author, poet
 Charles Onyango-Obbo, journalist and political commentator
 Mark Ouma, athletics journalist and former philosophy lecturer at Makerere
 David Rubadiri, poet, novelist, diplomat
 Ngũgĩ wa Thiong'o, Kenyan novelist
 Hilda Twongyeirwe, editor, poet, shortstory writer
 Timothy Wangusa, author, poet, one-time minister of education
 Elvania Namukwaya Zirimu, poet and dramatist

Scientists 
 Andrew Kambugu, physician, Sande-McKinnell Executive Director at the Uganda Infectious Disease Institute
 Robert Kezaala, physician, Senior Health Advisor at UNICEF
 Matthew Lukwiya, physician in Gulu during the 2000 Ebola outbreak
 Etheldreda Nakimuli-Mpungu, psychiatrist and epidemiologist
 Christine Obbo, socio-cultural anthropologist

Others
 Iddah Asin, lawyer and Johnson & Johnson executive 
 Nkulanga Enock, children's rights activist
 Busingye Kabumba, poet, lawyer and lecturer at law.
 Anne Kansiime, comedian
 Laeticia Kikonyogo, lawyer and judge
 Patrick Mazimhaka, deputy chairperson of the African Union's African Commission
 Andrew Mwenda, the managing director of the "Independent" Newspaper in Uganda
 Lilian Mary Nabulime, sculptor
 Harry Nkumbula, a leader during Zambia's struggle for independence
 Olara Otunnu, former United Nations under-secretary general and special representative for children and armed conflict
 John Sentamu, Anglican Archbishop of York, England, the first black Archbishop of the Church of England
 Martin Ssempa, controversial Ugandan pastor and AIDS activist

Halls of residence
As of September 2015, the halls of residence at Makerere University included the following:

For men

 Livingstone Hall
 Lumumba Hall
 Mitchell Hall
 Nkrumah Hall
 Nsibirwa Hall
 University Hall

For women
 Africa Hall
 Mary Stuart Hall
 Complex Hall

For students of medicine in their final years
 Galloway House

Postgraduate Hall
 Dag Hammarskjöld Hostel

Upcountry campuses
The following courses will be offered at the upcountry campuses:

Eastern Campus, Jinja
 Bachelor of Science in Computer Science
 Bachelor of Information Technology
 Bachelor of Development Studies
 Bachelor of Tourism

Replacement of main building
In September 2020 a fire gutted the Main Building of Makerere University, normally called the Main Building, destroying university records and the building structure. A subsequent investigation by an eleven-person team could not establish a definite cause of the fire but pointed to an electric fault as a likely cause.

In August 2021, the Cabinet of Uganda resolved to break down what remained of the Main Building after the fire. A new building, which will be designed to look like the original structure, will be erected at the same location, at a budgeted cost of UGX:21 billion (approx. US$6 million).

The engineering, procurement and construction (EPC) contract was awarded to Excel Construction Company Limited. a Ugandan company and a subsidiary of the Madhvani Group. The reconstruction process began in April 2022, starting with tearing down the structurally unsound original building, built in the 1930s and commissioned in 1941.

See also
African Geographical Review
African Writers Conference
East African Geographical Review
List of universities in Uganda
Makerere College School
Makerere University College of Health Sciences
Student movements in Uganda

References

External links

 
 Makerere University news

 

 
1922 establishments in Uganda
Association of African Universities
Buildings and structures in Kampala
Central Region, Uganda
Education in Kampala
Educational institutions established in 1922
Engineering universities and colleges in Uganda
Forestry education
Forestry in Uganda
Public universities
Universities and colleges in Uganda